Miconia ciliata is a species of shrub in the family Melastomataceae. It is native to North and South America.

References

ciliata
Flora of Peru
Flora of Brazil
Flora of Trinidad and Tobago